Elizabeth Mary Pye,  (born January 1946) is a British conservator and academic. She had studied prehistoric archaeology at the University of Edinburgh and conservation at the University of London, before becoming a conservator at the British Museum. She was Professor of Archaeological and Museum Conservation at UCL Institute of Archaeology until she retired in 2013: she is now emeritus professor.

On 3 March 1997, Pye was elected a Fellow of the Society of Antiquaries of London (FSA). In 2015, she was awarded the Conservation and Heritage Management Award by the Archaeological Institute of America for her "groundbreaking efforts to transform the field of objects conservation into a science-based discipline".

Selected works

References

Living people
Conservator-restorers
Academics of the UCL Institute of Archaeology
Employees of the British Museum
Fellows of the Society of Antiquaries of London
1946 births
Alumni of the University of Edinburgh
Alumni of the UCL Institute of Archaeology